McTeague is an 1899 novel by Frank Norris.

People
Dan McTeague (born 1962), Canadian politician, Member of Parliament
Dave McTeague (born 1952), American Democratic politician
Thomas McTeague (1893–1961), Northern Irish recipient of the George Cross

Films and stage works
McTeague (film), 1916 silent film based on the Norris novel
McTeague (opera), 1992 opera based on the Norris novel
Toby McTeague, a 1986 Canadian children's film

See also
McTigue (disambiguation)
McTeigue (disambiguation)